Études Phénoménologiques (English: Phenomenological Studies) is a yearly peer-reviewed academic journal originally published in French by Éditions Ousia. The journal was founded in 1985 by Jacques Taminiaux edited it until its closure in 2008.

In 2017, the publication was rebooted by the Centre d’Études Phénoménologiques of the Université catholique de Louvain in Belgium and by the Department of Philosophy at Marquette University, in Milwaukee, USA. The reboot is published by Peeters and edited by Pol Vandevelde and Danielle Lories.

See also 
 List of philosophy journals

References

External links 
 

Annual journals
Multilingual journals
Philosophy journals
Publications established in 1985
Continental philosophy literature
Phenomenology literature
Philosophy Documentation Center academic journals
1985 establishments in Belgium